The abyssal rattail, Coryphaenoides murrayi, is a species of rattail found around southern Australia, Fiji, and the east coast of New Zealand at depths of between .  Its reaches a length of  TL.

References
 
 
 Tony Ayling & Geoffrey Cox, Collins Guide to the Sea Fishes of New Zealand,  (William Collins Publishers Ltd, Auckland, New Zealand 1982) 

Macrouridae
Fish described in 1878
Taxa named by Albert Günther